Shih Chih-wei (born 14 August 1977 in Alishan, Chiayi County, Taiwan) is a retired Taiwanese baseball player. He played for the amateur Taiwan Cooperative Bank baseball team before being drafted by the La New Bears (later renamed the Lamigo Monkeys) of the Chinese Professional Baseball League (CPBL) in 2004.

Early life
Shih Chih-wei was born to an aboriginal family of Tsou tribal ancestry. He has been playing baseball since elementary school and graduated from the Taipei Physical Education College.

A member of the Taiwan Cooperative Bank baseball team, Shih was chosen to play in the 2003 World Port Tournament as a member of the national team.

Professional career
Shih was drafted by professional team La New Bears in 2004. In his professional debut, he got his first career base hit against the Brother Elephants. He hit his first career home run in Chengcing Lake Baseball Field; it was an inside-the-park home run.

He became the first player from the team to receive a monthly Most Valuable Player award. Though a rookie, Shih was selected to play in the 2004 CPBL All-Star Game as starting third baseman.

Along with teammate Lin Chih-sheng, the two are often referred to as the "Sheng-Shih Connection", which is derived from glove puppet film Legend of the Sacred Stone (Wade–Giles: Shèng-shíh Ch'uán-shuō). The two players played in the CPBL Future All-Star Game, which is a game with professional rookies playing against amateurs, and had a combined 7-for-8 performance. As a result of his performance in 2004, he received the CPBL Rookie of the Year Award, becoming the first player of the Bears to receive this honor. Shih was also given the CPBL Golden Glove Award at second base.

In 2006, Shih got the Golden Glove Award at third base. He was the first player of the Bears to receive the award twice.

International career
Shih has played in several international events such as the 1994 and 1995 World Junior Baseball Championships, in which Chinese Taipei earned a bronze and a silver medal. He also played in the 2003 World Port Tournament and 2003 Baseball World Cup as an amateur.

After becoming a professional, Shih participated in the 2006 Asia Series as a member of the La New Bears, who won the Taiwan Series that year. The team lost to the Hokkaido Nippon-Ham Fighters in the championship round, earning the position of second place. He also played in the 2006 Asian Games as a member of the national team, which won first place in the tournament.

Career statistics

References

External links
Career statistics from CPBL 

1977 births
Living people
Asian Games gold medalists for Chinese Taipei
Asian Games medalists in baseball
CTBC Brothers coaches
Baseball players at the 2006 Asian Games
Baseball players at the 2008 Summer Olympics
La New Bears players
Lamigo Monkeys players
Medalists at the 2006 Asian Games
Olympic baseball players of Taiwan
People from Chiayi County
Taiwanese baseball players
Tsou people